1-800 Contacts Inc. is an American contact lens retailer based in Draper, Utah. The brands that 1-800 Contacts use includes Johnson & Johnson Vision Care, Alcon, Bausch & Lomb and CooperVision. The company was founded as the industry's first way to buy contacts online and has since expanded to provide online prescription renewals, glasses, lens replacements, and the in-house AquaSoft Daily contact lenses brand. In 2006, its last year as a public company, the company reported net sales of US$247 million.

History
1-800 Contacts was founded in 1995 by Jonathan C. Coon and John F. Nichols, and was incorporated in February that year. The company held an IPO in 1998 on NASDAQ with the symbol CTAC with an offer price of $27.5M and share price of $12.50. They acquired Lens Express in 2002.

Over the years, 1-800 Contacts has been owned by several companies. In June 2007, 1-800 Contacts was acquired by Fenway Partners for $24.25 per share. In June 2012, 1-800 Contacts was sold to WellPoint (now Anthem).  In 2013 Wellpoint sold 1-800 Contacts to Thomas H. Lee Partners and glasses.com to Luxottica. AEA Investors acquired a majority interest in 1-800 Contacts in December 2015.

In 2008, 1-800 Contacts entered into a partnership with Walmart to integrate phone and Internet orders for contact lenses with eye-doctor services and operations in Walmart's stores, The agreement ended in 2013. In June 2013, 1-800 Contacts launched glasses.com, a domain which the company has held since 1999.

In 2020, global investment firm KKR acquired the company from AEA Investors. The sale follows many years of strong growth and technology innovation for the vision brand.

Direct-to-Consumer Business Model 
As one of the first direct-to-consumer models in the vision industry, 1-800 Contacts has spent the past 25 years providing direct access to contact lens at competitive prices for consumers. It offers a "Gajillion Percent Promise" on millions of contact lens in stock with a best-price guarantee. The company added ExpressExam, which takes 10 minutes to get a doctor-issued prescription within 24 hours.The brand hopes to make vision access easier for everyone at affordable prices.

Brand awareness 
It was hoped that consumers would more easily remember the company's phone number, and thus be more likely to become repeat customers. 1800Contacts.com is also a domain name owned by the company in which a customer may order online. The combined toll-free number and matching domain is called a "Toll-Free Domain" or a "Teledotcom".

1-800 Contacts' mascot is Seymour, the eye guy. He is an eyeball with arms and legs that is often seen in marketing communications and throughout 1-800 Contacts workplaces.

The "My Brand" commercial is 1-800 Contacts' most well known commercial and has become a cult classic due to a gaming meme in 2012. The reenactment of the commercial has the characters Tali and Commander Shepherd from the sci-fi video game series Mass Effect.

Acquisitions

Liingo 
In 2017, 1-800 Contacts acquired Liingo, which is an eyewear brand that offers a free in-home try on program and free prescription lenses with every pair. Liingo Eyewear was founded in October 2016, in Draper, Utah. Their business models centers on affordable prices, trendy styles, and free prescription lenses included with every pair.

6over6 
In 2019, 1-800 Contacts acquired 6over6, which is a digital healthcare technology that enables consumers to perform their own vision tests from anywhere using a computer or smartphone. 6over6's mission is to democratize access to vision care to help the whole world see clearly and chose to join 1-800 Contacts because of a shared commitment to advancing vision care and increasing access and affordability for people around the world.

Ditto 
In 2021, 1-800 Contacts acquired Ditto, a global leader in virtual eyewear try-on technology. Since 2011, more than 60 million people per year benefited from Ditto's technology, which allows shoppers to realistically try-on eyewear and receive insightful frame recommendations.

Lawsuits

WhenU lawsuit 

1-800 Contacts sued WhenU over pop-up advertisements in 2002. In the suit against WhenU, which also named Vision Direct as a co-defendant, 1-800 Contacts alleged that the advertisements provided by WhenU, which advertised competitors of 1-800 Contacts (such as Vision Direct) when people viewed the company's web site, as "inherently deceptive" and one that "misleads users into falsely believing the pop-up advertisements supplied by WhenU.com are in actuality advertisements authorized by and originating with the underlying Web site".

In December 2003, Judge Deborah Batts of the United States District Court for the Southern District of New York granted a preliminary injunction, barring WhenU from delivering the advertisements to some web surfers, on the grounds that it constituted trademark infringement violating the Lanham Act. WhenU appealed, and the United States Court of Appeals for the Second Circuit held that WhenU's actions did not amount to the "use" that the Lanham Act requires in order to constitute trademark infringement.

The appeals court reversed the preliminary injunction and ordered the dismissal of all claims made by 1-800 Contacts that were based upon trademark infringement, leaving the claims based upon unfair competition and copyright infringement.  The district court had already found that 1-800 Contacts was unlikely to prevail in its copyright infringement claims, finding that "the conduct neither violated [the] plaintiff's right to display its copyrighted website, nor its right to create derivative works therefrom".

The Electronic Frontier Foundation criticized the case, stating that it was "not to help [people] fight off adware and spyware" but was rather intended to allow companies "to gain control over [a computer's] desktop", where the legal principles being employed "would create a precedent that would enable trademark owners to dictate what could be open on your desktop when you visit their websites". At the time of the appeal, it filed an amicus curiae brief urging the Appeals Court to limit the reach of the "initial interest confusion" doctrine that had been applied by the District Court.

In addition to the WhenU case, 1-800 Contacts has been involved in other trademark infringement suits revolving around the issue of keyword advertising. On March 8, 2010, 1-800 Contacts sued Contact Lens King, Inc. Ezcontacts.com for trademark infringement based on their use of "1-800 CONTACTS" trademarks as keywords to trigger sponsored ads directing consumers to Contact Lens King's website and products.

Lens.com lawsuit 
1-800 Contacts was also involved in several lawsuits against Lens.com, Inc., including a trademark cancellation case in the United States Court of Appeals for the Federal Circuit, Lens.com, Inc. v. 1-800 Contacts, Inc., in which the Court determined that Lens.com's trademark "LENS", held in connection with "computer software", had been abandoned because Lens.com merely used software to sell contact lenses over the internet, while consumers had no association between the trademark and computer software.

In 2013, the Tenth Circuit Court of Appeals held that Lens.com did not commit trademark infringement when it purchased search advertisements using 1-800 Contacts' federally registered 1800 CONTACTS trademark as a keyword.  In August 2016, the Federal Trade Commission filed an administrative complaint against 1-800 Contacts alleging, among other things, that its search advertising trademark enforcement practices have unreasonably restrained competition in violation of the FTC Act. 1-800 Contacts has denied all wrongdoing.  , the case was still being litigated.

DITTO and FTC lawsuits 
On April 17, 2013, the Electronic Frontier Foundation claimed that 1-800 Contacts abused patent law by acting like a patent troll in its lawsuit against DITTO. In a blog post, the EFF accused 1-800 Contacts of "leveraging the massive expense of patent litigation to squelch the competition" and asked its followers to help DITTO by crowdsourcing prior art.

On August 8, 2016, the Federal Trade Commission filed an administrative complaint charging that 1-800 Contacts, the largest online retailer of contact lenses in the United States, unlawfully orchestrated a web of anti-competitive agreements with rival online contact lens sellers that suppress competition in certain online search advertising auctions and that restrict truthful and non-misleading internet advertising to consumers.

According to the administrative complaint, 1-800 Contacts entered into bidding agreements with at least 14 competing online contact lens retailers that eliminate competition in auctions to place advertisements on the search results page generated by online search engines such as Google and Bing. The complaint alleges that these bidding agreements unreasonably restrain price competition in internet search auctions, and restrict truthful and non-misleading advertising to consumers, constituting an unfair method of competition in violation of federal law.

In an initial decision entered on October 27, 2017, and announced on October 30, 2017, Chief Administrative Law Judge D. Michael Chappell upheld a Federal Trade Commission complaint against 1-800 Contacts, ruling that the FTC has proved that the nation's largest online retailer of contact lenses unlawfully orchestrated a web of anti-competitive agreements with rival online contact lens sellers.

An order Judge Chappell included with the initial decision would bar 1-800 Contacts from agreeing with a marketer or seller of any contact lens product to restrict, prohibit, regulate or otherwise limit that seller's participation in search advertising auctions, and would also bar 1-800 Contacts from instructing search engines to restrict or prohibit any seller's use of any keyword (a word or phrase used to instruct a search engine to display specified search advertising), or to require any seller to use any negative keyword (a word or phrase used to instruct a search engine not to display specified search advertising).

Also under the order, 1-800 Contacts would be barred from agreeing with a seller to restrict, prohibit, regulate or otherwise limit that seller's use of truthful, non-deceptive, and non-trademark-infringing advertising or promotion. The order would also require the company to stop enforcing or attempting to enforce any and all provisions, terms, or requirements in any existing agreement or court order that impose a condition on a seller that would be inconsistent with the order.

References

External links

SEC Filing on NASDAQ

1995 establishments in Utah
Companies based in Utah
American companies established in 1995
Retail companies established in 1995
800-Contacts
Contact lenses
Eyewear companies of the United States
2007 mergers and acquisitions
2012 mergers and acquisitions
2013 mergers and acquisitions
2015 mergers and acquisitions